Miguel S. White (October 9, 1909 – August 30, 1942) was a Filipino track and field athlete of Filipino-American descent who competed for the Philippines in the 400 metre hurdles at the 1936 Summer Olympics held in Berlin, Germany, winning a bronze medal in the process.

White was from Legazpi, Albay. He was killed in military action during the Japanese invasion of the Philippines. At the time of his death, White was a lieutenant assigned to the 51st Division. Before World War II, White was a Philippine scout.

References

Greek bibliography: Andreou,Evangelos: "The star of champion shone..." Ed. EUARCE 2011 ("Miguel White" p. 30,75) Ευάγγελος Ανδρέου, Το αστέρι του πρωταθλητή άναψε... / ο βαλκανιονίκης του μεσοπολέμου Γιάννης Σκιαδάς, EUARCE 2011  ("Μίγκουελ Ουάιτ/Miguel White" σ.30,75)

External links
 
 
 

1909 births
1942 deaths
Filipino male hurdlers
Olympic track and field athletes of the Philippines
Olympic bronze medalists for the Philippines
Medalists at the 1936 Summer Olympics
Athletes (track and field) at the 1936 Summer Olympics
Filipino military personnel killed in World War II
American military personnel of Filipino descent
Filipino military personnel of World War II
National Collegiate Athletic Association (Philippines) players
American sportspeople of Filipino descent
People from Legazpi, Albay
Sportspeople from Albay
Olympic bronze medalists in athletics (track and field)
Philippine Sports Hall of Fame inductees